Maroon is a dark reddish purple or dark brownish red colour.

Maroon may also refer to:
 Marooning, the intentional act of abandoning someone in an uninhabited area
 Maroons, descendants of enslaved Africans in the Americas who escaped and formed free settlements

Music
 Maroon (band), a German band
 Maroon (Barenaked Ladies album) (2000)
 Maroon (The Webb Brothers album) (2000)
 "Maroon" (song), a 2022 song by Taylor Swift

Places
 Maroon Dam, Queensland, Australia
 Maroon Town, Jamaica
 Maroon Town, Sierra Leone
 Mount Maroon, Queensland, Australia

Other uses
 Maroon (rocket), a loud rocket used for signalling
 Maroon (surname)
 The Chicago Maroon, a student newspaper of the University of Chicago
 Maroon Cartoons, a fictional studio in Who Framed Roger Rabbit

See also
 Maroon 5, an American pop rock band
 Marooned (disambiguation)
 Marooning (disambiguation)
 Maroons (disambiguation)